The Campsie Fells (also known as the Campsies; Scottish Gaelic: Monadh Chamaisidh) are a range of hills in central Scotland, stretching east to west from Denny Muir to Dumgoyne in Stirlingshire and overlooking Strathkelvin to the south. The southern extent of the range falls within East Dunbartonshire. The range overlooks the villages of Strathblane, Blanefield, Milton Of Campsie, Lennoxtown and Torrance to the south; Killearn to the west, and Fintry and Strathendrick to the north. The Fintry Hills lie further to the north; Kilpatrick Hills lie to the west and the Kilsyth Hills to the east.

Walking
Earl's Seat is the highest point of the Campsie Fells, measuring 578 m (1,896 ft). On the top of Earl's Seat is a trig point. Two main ways of climbing Earl's Seat are by going past Dumgoyne from the Glengoyne Distillery or going up the Fin Glen from Clachan of Campsie.

Etymology
The name is taken from one of the individual hills in the range, called Campsie; meaning "crooked fairy hill", from the Scottish Gaelic cam, meaning "crooked", and sìth meaning "fairy". "Fell" originates from the Old Norse word , meaning "hill".

Geology
Erosion along the line of a geological fault known as the Campsie Fault has left tiers of rock representing some 30 lava flows which date from the Carboniferous period. The headwaters of the River Carron rise in the Campsies.

Cultural relevance
The Campsie Fells have cemented their place in history as the birthplace of Scottish skiing, when William W. Naismith of Glasgow skied the area, becoming the first ever man to ski in Scotland in March 1892. The Monty Python film Monty Python's The Meaning of Life used the Campsies as a location, standing in for Natal during the Anglo-Zulu War of 1879. On one day it was so cold that the extras acting as the Zulu warriors refused to put on their costumes and that day's filming was abandoned.

References

External links
 Computer-generated virtual panoramas Earl's Seat Index

Hills of the Scottish Midland Valley
Volcanoes of Scotland
Carboniferous volcanism
Mountains and hills of Stirling (council area)
Mountains and hills of East Dunbartonshire
Mountain ranges of Scotland